Shepody Bay is a tidal embayment, an extension of the Bay of Fundy in New Brunswick, Canada, which consists of  of open water and  of mudflats, with  of saline marsh on the west, and eroding sand and gravel beaches covering an area of approximately  on the eastern shore. The intertidal mudflats "support internationally important numbers of the crustacean Corophium volutator, the principal food source for millions of fall migrating shorebirds".

The nearest population centre is Riverside-Albert with a population of about 320. The Trans Canada Trail passes across part of Shepody Marsh.

Major streams feeding into the bay are the Shepody River, Petitcodiac River and Memramcook River. These three rivers gave the area its name under Acadian occupation in the seventeenth and eighteenth century, Trois Rivieres.

See also
Notable landforms and features nearby:
 Cape Enrage
 Hopewell Rocks
 Mary's Point
 Maringouin Peninsula
 Grindstone Island

References

Bays of New Brunswick
Ramsar sites in Canada
Important Bird Areas of New Brunswick
Landforms of Westmorland County, New Brunswick
Landforms of Albert County, New Brunswick
Wetlands of New Brunswick